The Tinkertoy Construction Set is a toy construction set for children. It was designed in 1914—six years after the Frank Hornby's Meccano sets—by Charles H. Pajeau, who formed the Toy Tinker Company in Evanston, Illinois to manufacture them. Pajeau, a stonemason, designed the toy after seeing children play with sticks and empty spools of thread. Pajeau partnered with Robert Pettit and Gordon Tinker to market a toy that would allow and inspire children to use their imaginations. After an initially-slow start, over a million were sold.

The cornerstone of the set is a wooden spool roughly two inches (5 cm) in diameter, with holes drilled every 45 degrees around the perimeter and one through the center. Unlike the center, the perimeter holes do not go all the way through. With the differing-length sticks, the set was intended to be based on the Pythagorean progressive right triangle.

The sets were introduced to the public through displays in and around Chicago which included model Ferris wheels. Tinkertoys have been used to construct complex machines, including Danny Hillis's tic-tac-toe-playing computer (now in the collection of the Computer History Museum in Mountain View, California) and a robot at Cornell University in 1998.

One of Tinkertoy’s distinctive features is the toy’s packaging. Initially, the mailing tube design was chosen to reduce shipping costs. Early versions of the packaging included an address label on the tube with space for postage. To assist buyers in differentiating between the various offerings, sets were placed in mail tube packages of different sizes and also delineated with a number (e.g.: 116, 136) and a name (e.g.: major, prep, big boy, junior, grad). A colorful "how-to" instruction guide accompanied each set. In the 1950s, color was added and the wooden sticks appeared in red, green, blue, and peach.

The main manufacturing location was a 65,000-square-foot four-story plant at 2012 Ridge Avenue, Evanston, Illinois.

Tinkertoys were inducted into the National Toy Hall of Fame at The Strong in Rochester, New York, in 1998.

Hasbro bought the Tinkertoy brand and currently produces both Tinkertoy Plastic and Tinkertoy Classic (wood) sets and parts. The US rights are now owned by Basic Fun!.

Standard parts
In addition to the spools, a standard Tinkertoy set includes:
Wheels, which are thinner than spools, but larger in diameter. Like spools, their center holes have a snug fit.
Caps, originally wooden, but later plastic, cylindrical pieces with a single blind axial hole snugly fitted to the rods.
Couplings, small cylindrical pieces (originally wood; later plastic) approximately 2 inches long and half an inch in diameter, with snug-fitting blind-drilled holes in either end, and a loose-fitting through-drilled hole crosswise through the center of the part.
Pulleys, identical to spools, except that the center holes are loose-fitting.
"Part W", approximately the same size and shape as a spool, but with perimeter holes 90 degrees apart, loose-fitting center holes, and four tight-fitting through-drilled holes parallel to the center hole. This allows for free-spinning parts, and also for construction of "cage" or "lantern" gears.
Short pointed sticks (originally wood, but later plastic), typically red, and flags ("fan blades"), typically green plastic, and various other small parts.
Spools and pulleys all have a single groove around the outside; "Part W" has two parallel grooves.

Sticks (or "rods") are slotted on each end, both to provide slight flexibility when inserted into snug-fitting holes, and to allow thin cards, flags, and strings to be inserted into the slots. They are color-coded by size; in the 1960s-era sets, they were, in order from shortest to longest, orange, peach, blue, red, green, and violet. Each successively longer rod is (with allowances for the size of the spools) the next smaller size times the square root of two; thus any two of the same size will combine with one of the next size up, and three spools, to form an isosceles right triangle (45°–45°–90°).

Tinkertoy sticks before 1992 were made with a diameter of 0.25 inch. The earlier sets had natural wood sticks, but changed to colored sticks in the late 1950s. From measurement, the orange sticks are 1.25 inches long; peach, 2.15; blue, 3.35; red, 5.05; green, 7.40; and, purple, 10.85. Spools are 1.35 inches in diameter with holes of 0.30 inch depth.

Most of the larger sets also include a driveshaft (an unfinished wooden rod without slotted ends, of an intermediate length between "green" and "violet", normally turned with a small plastic crank.

The Ultra Construction Set also includes connectors, small cylindrical plastic pieces approximately 2 inches long with a slot in either end and a slotted hole crosswise through the center of the part.

Sets with battery-powered electric motors were available; these sets also typically included at least one wooden "double pulley" with a single snug-fitting through-drilled center hole, and grooved rims at two diameters, allowing different moving parts to operate at different speeds.

See also

 K'Nex, a similar construction toy
 Construction toy § Categories
 Lego
 Fischertechnik
 Meccano
 Lincoln Logs

References

Strange, Craig. Collector's Guide to Tinker Toys. .
Dewdney, A. K. The Tinkertoy Computer and Other Machinations. .

External links
Cornell University press release for Tinkertoy robot

Construction toys
Hasbro products
Products introduced in 1914
Wooden toys
1910s toys